Arrhenatherum, commonly called oatgrass or button-grass, is a genus of Eurasian and North African plants in the grass family.

Description
Wild forms can resemble wild oat (Avena) or fescue (Festuca). Oatgrasses are very common perennials with yellowish roots. The shining stems grow to a height of 1.5 meters, but die off in winter. The leaves are hairless with blunt ligules. The inflorescence is a panicle with two-flowered bisexual spikelets.

 Species
 Arrhenatherum album - tall oatgrass - Mediterranean from Portugal to Cyprus
 Arrhenatherum calderae - Tenerife in Canary Islands
 Arrhenatherum kotschyii - Turkey, Caucasus, Syria, Lebanon, Palestine, Jordan, Iraq, Iran, Afghanistan
 Arrhenatherum longifolium - France, Spain, Portugal, Morocco
 Arrhennatherum palaestinum - eastern Mediterranean from Greece to Iraq
 Arrhenatherum pallens - Portugal

 formerly included
numerous species now considered better suited to other genera: Avenula Danthoniastrum Duthiea Helictochloa Helictotrichon Sphenopholis

See also
 List of Poaceae genera

References

Pooideae
Poaceae genera
Taxa named by Palisot de Beauvois